

Wilhelm Weber (19 March 1918 – 2 March 1980) was a mid-level commander in the Waffen-SS of Nazi Germany during World War II. He was a member of the SS Division Charlemagne and was a recipient of the Knight's Cross of the Iron Cross.

In April 1945, about 350 men of the division volunteered to go to fight in the Battle of Berlin in a unit which became known as Sturmbataillon Charlemagne. Weber went with the group to Berlin as a group commander. During the fighting on 29 April, Weber was wounded and evacuated to the make-swift field hospital in the basement of the Reich Chancellery. It was his sixth combat wound of the war. While there he briefed area commander, SS-Brigadeführer Wilhelm Mohnke as to the situation along front lines of the government district. He was awarded the Knight's Cross of the Iron Cross by Mohnke on 29 April.

Awards and decorations

 Knight's Cross of the Iron Cross on 29 April 1945 as Obersturmführer and leader of the divisions combat school of the 33. Freiwilligen-Grenadier-Division der SS "Charlemagne"

References

Citations

Bibliography

 
 
 

1918 births
1980 deaths
People from Detmold
People from Lippe
SS-Obersturmführer
Recipients of the Knight's Cross of the Iron Cross
Waffen-SS personnel
Military personnel from North Rhine-Westphalia